Joy L. Bauer, MS, RD, CDN (born November 6, 1963), is the host of NBC's "Health & Happiness" and the health and nutrition expert on The Today Show. Bauer is the author of 12 bestsellers.

Bauer is a monthly columnist for Woman's Day and the official nutritionist for the New York City Ballet. She was formerly the co-host of the RLTV show "Good Food, Good Deeds."

Career 
Bauer began her career at Mount Sinai Medical Center in New York City as the clinical nutritionist with their neurosurgical team. She taught Anatomy & Physiology and Sports Nutrition at New York University School of Professional Studies. She served as the Director for Nutrition for the Pediatric Cardiology Department at Mount Sinai Medical Center. While at Mount Sinai, Bauer created and implemented "Heart-Smart Kids," a health program for underprivileged children living in Harlem.

Bauer served as nutrition consultant for the Columbia Presbyterian Medical Center, where she designed and supervised its ongoing research in eating disorders and weight management. She was the nutritionist for New York University's faculty, students and athletes. As the founder and CEO of Joy Bauer Nutrition, she headed one of the largest nutrition centers in the country for close to two decades.

Bauer has received several awards, including the National Media Excellence Award from the Academy of Nutrition and Dietetics in 2010 and the American Society of Nutrition Science in 2012.

In 2014, Bauer founded Nourish Snacks.

Family life 
Bauer lives in New York with her husband, Ian, her daughters Jesse and Ayden Jane, and her son Cole. Bauer is Jewish.

Books and publications 
Bauer is the author of a number of health books, cookbooks and diet books, including:
Yummy Yoga (Abrams Books for Young Readers, October 2019)
Joy's Simple Food Remedies (Hay House, October 2018)
From Junk Food to Joy Food (Hay House, February 2016)
The Joy Fit Club Cookbook, Diet Plan & Inspiration (Houghton Mifflin Harcourt; 2012)
Joy Bauer's Food Cures was reviewed by the American Dietetic Association and called "a common-sense, fad-free approach to using food to improve your health and feel your best." Originally published in 2007, it was revised and reissued in 2011.
Slim & Scrumptious (William Morrow Cookbooks; 2010)
Your Inner Skinny: Four Steps to Thin Forever (William Morrow; 2009) was reviewed in the Chicago Tribune 
Joy's LIFE Diet , a book reviewed in Publishers Weekly,  January 2009, and  placed No. 1 on the April 29, 2007 New York Times Bestseller Paperback How To List.
Prevention 3-2-1 Weight Loss Plan (Rodale Books; 2007)
 The 90/10 Weight Loss Cookbook (St. Martin's Griffin; 2004)
 Cooking with Joy: The 90/10 Cookbook (St. Martin's Press; 2004)
 The 90/10 Weight Loss Plan (St. Martin's Griffin; 2001)
 The Complete Idiot's Guide to Total Nutrition (Alpha; 1999)
 The Complete Idiot's Guide to Eating Smart (Alpha; 1996)

Professional affiliations 
 Commission on Dietetic Registration: Registered Dietitian
 New York State Certified Dietitian–Nutritionist
 Academy of Nutrition and Dietetics, Sports & Cardiovascular Nutritionist Group
 Academy of Nutrition and Dietetics, Pediatric Practice Group
 NBC’s TODAY Show, Nutrition and Health Expert
 Nourish Snacks, Founder 
 Contributing Editor/Columnist, Woman’s Day Magazine 
 New York City Ballet, Nutritionist
 Alzheimer's Foundation of America
 Alliance for a Healthier Generation

Education 
Bauer received her bachelor's degree in Kinesiological Sciences from the University of Maryland, College Park and a master of science in nutrition from New York University.

References

External links
Official website

1963 births
Living people
University of Maryland, College Park alumni
20th-century American Jews
American women nutritionists
American nutritionists
Steinhardt School of Culture, Education, and Human Development alumni
American women chief executives
21st-century American Jews
20th-century American women
21st-century American women